Pablo Andrés Sánchez Spucches (born 3 January 1973), nicknamed Vitamina, is an Argentine football manager and former player who played as a midfielder.

He spent his 13-year professional career in four countries. In 2007, he started working as a manager.

Playing career
Born in Rosario, Santa Fe, Sánchez started playing for Rosario Central, before moving to Feyenoord in 1996. He scored a career-best 16 goals in his first season in the Eredivisie, helping the Rotterdam team to a final runner-up place. Later, he represented briefly Deportivo Alavés from Spain and Belgian side RC Harelbeke.

Sánchez returned home in 1999, first with Club de Gimnasia y Esgrima La Plata then with his first club Rosario. After being told by coach Ángel Tulio Zof he was not needed he signed with Quilmes Atlético Club, but suffered a serious shoulder injury shortly after, having to retire from the sport at 32.

Coaching career
Sánchez began his managerial career at Club Atlético Banfield, helping the team avoid relegation from the Primera División. He also managed Rosario Central for nine games, until he was fired on 6 October 2008.

In February 2009, Sánchez agreed to take charge of Bolivian Primera División club Oriente Petrolero, being relieved of his duties in early October of that year. On 5 December 2012 he moved countries again, being appointed at C.D. Universidad de Concepción in Chile.

Sánchez continued to work in the Chilean Primera División the following years, being in charge of O'Higgins FC, Everton de Viña del Mar and Deportes Iquique. One decade after leaving, he returned to both the Bolivian top tier and Oriente.

On 24 October 2022, Palestino announced an agreement with Sánchez to become the club manager since December 2022 replacing Gustavo Costas.

References

External links
Argentine League player statistics at Fútbol XXI 
Argentine League coach statistics at Fútbol XXI 

Beijen profile 

1973 births
Living people
Footballers from Rosario, Santa Fe
Argentine footballers
Association football midfielders
Argentine Primera División players
Rosario Central footballers
Club de Gimnasia y Esgrima La Plata footballers
Quilmes Atlético Club footballers
Eredivisie players
Feyenoord players
La Liga players
Deportivo Alavés players
Belgian Pro League players
K.R.C. Zuid-West-Vlaanderen players
Argentine expatriate footballers
Expatriate footballers in the Netherlands
Expatriate footballers in Spain
Expatriate footballers in Belgium
Argentine expatriate sportspeople in the Netherlands
Argentine expatriate sportspeople in Spain
Argentine expatriate sportspeople in Belgium
Argentine football managers
Argentine Primera División managers
Club Atlético Banfield managers
Rosario Central managers
Oriente Petrolero managers
Chilean Primera División managers
Universidad de Concepción managers
O'Higgins F.C. managers
Everton de Viña del Mar managers
Deportes Iquique managers
Audax Italiano managers
Club Deportivo Palestino managers
Argentine expatriate football managers
Expatriate football managers in Bolivia
Expatriate football managers in Chile
Argentine expatriate sportspeople in Bolivia
Argentine expatriate sportspeople in Chile